Newdigate Brickworks is a   nature reserve in Newdigate in Surrey. It is managed by the Surrey Wildlife Trust.

The clay pits of this former brickworks are now lakes and ponds which provide habitats for great crested newts and dragonflies such as the broad-bodied chaser and emperor. Other habitats are woodland, scrub, grassland and marsh and 188 plant species have been recorded.

There is access from Hoggspudding Lane.

References

Surrey Wildlife Trust